Adenanthos cuneatus is a shrub of the family Proteaceae, native to the south coast of Western Australia. It was described by Alex George in 1974.

References

stictus
Eudicots of Western Australia